Anne Plantagenet may refer to:

 Anne of York (daughter of Edward IV) (1475–1511)
 Anne Plantagenet (writer) (born 1972), (1972, French novelist and translator
 Anne Plantagenet, Duchess of Exeter (1439–1476)